The 1983 Virginia Slims of Boston was a women's tennis tournament played onindoor carpet courts at the Walter Brown Arena in Boston, Massachusetts in the United States that was part of the 1983 Virginia Slims World Championship Series. The tournament was held from March 14 through March 20, 1983. Wendy Turnbull won the singles title and earned $30,000 first-prize money as well as 200 Virginia Slims Series points.

Finals

Singles

 Wendy Turnbull defeated  Sylvia Hanika 6–4, 3–6, 6–4
 It was Turnbull's 1st singles title of the year and the 10th of her career.

Doubles

 Jo Durie /  Ann Kiyomura defeated  Kathy Jordan /  Anne Smith 6–3, 6–1
 It was Durie's 1st title of the year and the 2nd of her career. It was Kiyomura's 2nd title of the year and the 15th of her career.

References

Virginia Slims of Boston
Virginia Slims of Boston
Virgin
Virgin